Francisco Augusto Metrass (7 February 1825, Lisbon - 14 February 1861, Madeira) was a Portuguese painter in the Romantic style.

Biography 
He came from a wealthy German immigrant family that ran an import business. Going against his father's wishes, he began his artistic studies in 1836, when he was only eleven, as an unmatriculated student at the Academy of Fine Arts in Lisbon. His teachers there included  and António Manuel da Fonseca. Initially, he was a portrait painter.

Several years later, in 1844, he was a student in Rome, where he associated with Johann Friedrich Overbeck, Peter von Cornelius and other German painters, coming under the influence of the Nazarene movement.

Upon returning to Portugal, he abandoned portraits in favor of history painting and held his first exhibition in a palace belonging to Count of Lumiares. His work was not favorably received, so he sold all of his paintings to an auction house and went to France for further studies. In 1853, he was back in Portugal, having changed his style to more resemble that of the old Dutch Masters. His new works found favor with the public and King Fedinand II, who purchased his painting of a scene from the life of Luís Vaz de Camões. He also created some sketches on Orientalist themes, but these proved unsatisfactory.

He was appointed a Professor of history painting at the Academy in 1854 after winning a competition with his painting of Solomon's Judgment. The following year, he had a major showing at the Exposition Universelle.

Suffering from  tuberculosis, he became increasingly unable to work. A trip to Italy, seeking a more healthful climate, made his condition worse, so he went to Madeira, thinking the climate might be better, but died there.

References

Further reading
 José Maria D'Andrade Ferreira, "Francisco Augusto Metrass", from Revista Contemporânea de Portugal e Brasil Vol.3, Online @ Google Books
 Diogo de Macedo, Quatro pintores românticos: Memeses, Metrass, Patrício, Rodrigues, Issue 6 of Colecção Museum (1949)

External links

 Digitalized works @ the Biblioteca Nacional de Portugal
 "Classical Scene" by Metrass @ Veritas Art Auctioneers

1825 births
1861 deaths
People from Lisbon
19th-century Portuguese painters
Portuguese male painters
19th-century male artists